Yank is a nickname for:

 Yank Adams (1847–1923), American professional carom billiards player specializing in finger billiards
 Yank Azman (born 1947), Canadian television and movie actor
 Yank Barry (born 1948), Canadian musician and businessman
 Charles A. Bernier (1890–1963), American football, basketball and baseball player, coach and college administrator
 Irwin Boyd (1908–1979), American National Hockey League player
 Robert B. "Yank" Heisler (born 1949), American retired business executive and current university dean
 Yank Lawson (1911–1995), American jazz trumpeter
 Yank Levy (1897–1965), Canadian soldier, military instructor and author of one of the first manuals on guerrilla warfare
 Yank Rachell (1910–1997), American country blues mandolin and guitar player
 Yank Robinson (1857–1894), American Major League Baseball player
 Yank Terry (1911–1979), American Major League Baseball pitcher
 Wayne Warren (born 1962), Welsh darts player
 Stan Yerkes (1874–1940), American Major League Baseball pitcher

See also 

 Danny Culloty, American-born former Gaelic football player nicknamed "The Yank"
 Bianca Hammett (born 1990), Australian synchronised swimmer nicknamed "Yanks"

Lists of people by nickname